The 4 Hours of Imola was an endurance motor race held at the Autodromo Enzo e Dino Ferrari near Imola, Italy on 17–18 May 2014, and served as the second round of the 2014 European Le Mans Series.

Car no. 38 driven by Simon Dolan, Harry Tincknell and Filipe Albuquerque won the race overall for Jota Racing, ahead of Sébastien Loeb Racing's Vincent Capillaire and Jan Charouz and Signatech Alpine's Paul-Loup Chatin, Nelson Panciatici and Oliver Webb.

The LMGTE category was led by SMP Racing's trio, Andrea Bertolini, Viktor Shaitar and Sergey Zlobin, while Formula Racing's Johnny Laursen, Mikkel Mac and Andrea Piccini were victorious in the GTC class.

Qualifying

Qualifying result
Pole positions in each class are denoted in bold.

Race

Race result
Class winners in bold.

References

Imola
Imola